Emil Konradsen Ceïde (born 3 September 2001) is a Norwegian professional footballer who plays as a winger for Serie A club Sassuolo.

Club career
Konradsen Ceïde signed for Rosenborg from Finnsnes in May 2017.

On 20 April 2018, he made his debut for Rosenborg coming on against Trygg/Lade in a Cup game which Rosenborg won 4–2. A week later he came on as a substitute against Lillestrøm in the 2018 Mesterfinalen and helped secure a 1–0 victory. He made his league debut 7 July the same year, coming on in the 84th minute against Tromsø in a 2–1 home win. In May 2019, he signed a new contract with Rosenborg until the end of 2021, making him an official member of the first team squad. In August 2019 he started only his second match for Rosenborg, contributing big in a 5–2 win over Tromsø by providing two assists.

On 21 January 2022, he joined Italian Serie A club Sassuolo on loan with an obligation to buy after the season.

Personal life
Emil's father is Haitian while his mother is Norwegian. He has a twin brother named Mikkel who is also at Rosenborg, playing for the academy. They are second cousins with Bodø/Glimt player Anders Konradsen and Bodø/Glimt player Morten Konradsen.

Career statistics

Club

Honours
Rosenborg
Norwegian Football Cup: 2018
Mesterfinalen: 2018

Rosenborg U19
Norwegian U-19 Championship: 2019

References

External links
 

2001 births
Living people
People from Senja
Norwegian people of Haitian descent
Sportspeople from Troms og Finnmark
Norwegian footballers
Association football forwards
Norway under-21 international footballers
Norway youth international footballers
Eliteserien players
Norwegian Second Division players
Serie A players
Rosenborg BK players
U.S. Sassuolo Calcio players
Norwegian expatriate footballers
Norwegian expatriate sportspeople in Italy
Expatriate footballers in Italy